Eaters may refer to:

 Eaters, people who eat, see eating
 Geleen Eaters, a professional ice hockey team

See also

 Eater (disambiguation)